The Canton of Elbeuf is a canton situated in the Seine-Maritime département and in the Normandy region of northern France.

Geography 

Composition 
At the French canton reorganisation which came into effect in March 2015, the canton was expanded from 4 to 6 communes:
La Bouille
Elbeuf
Grand-Couronne
La Londe
Moulineaux
Orival

Population

See also 
 Arrondissements of the Seine-Maritime department
 Cantons of the Seine-Maritime department
 Communes of the Seine-Maritime department

References

Elbeuf